Vancouver Granville is a federal electoral district in British Columbia, Canada, that has been represented in the House of Commons of Canada since 2015. The district includes all or significant portions of the Kerrisdale, Marpole, Oakridge, Shaughnessy, South Cambie, Fairview and Riley Park–Little Mountain neighbourhoods. Based on the Canada 2011 Census data, the population of the district is 99,886.

History
Vancouver Granville was created by the 2012 federal electoral boundaries redistribution and was legally defined in the 2013 representation order. It came into effect upon the call of the 42nd Canadian federal election, which happened in October 2015. It was created out of the electoral districts of Vancouver Centre (38%), Vancouver Quadra (18%), Vancouver Kingsway (19%) and Vancouver South (26%).

In April 2019, the district's first MP, Jody Wilson-Raybould, was expelled from the Liberal Party after clashing with Prime Minister Justin Trudeau over the SNC-Lavalin affair. Even though she was removed from the party, many of the riding’s constituents continued to support her in the federal election as an Independent MP candidate.  She subsequently won as an Independent in the 2019 federal general election, beating her nearest rival, the Liberal candidate, by almost 3,000 votes. In July 2021, Wilson-Raybould announced that she would not stand again for re-election.

Demographics

According to the Canada 2021 Census

Languages: 53.2% English, 11.1% Mandarin, 10.1% Cantonese, 2.1% Spanish, 1.8% Tagalog, 1.6% French, 1.4% Japanese, 1.4% Korean
Religions: 57.4% No Religion, 30% Christian (12.2% Catholic, 2.4% Anglican, 1.8% United Church, 1.3% Christian Orthodox), 3.6% Buddhist, 3% Jewish, 2.2% Muslim, 1.3% Hindu, 1.2% Sikh
Median income: $45,600 (2020) 
Average income: $71,400 (2010)

Geography

Vancouver Granville consists of that part of the City of Vancouver described as follows: commencing at the intersection of the southerly limit of said city with the southerly production of Cambie Street; thence northerly along said production and Cambie Street to 41st Avenue West; thence easterly along said avenue and 41st Avenue East to Main Street; thence northerly along said street to 16th Avenue East; thence westerly along said avenue to Ontario Street; thence northerly along said street to 2nd Avenue West; thence westerly and southwesterly along said avenue to 6th Avenue West; thence westerly along said avenue to 4th Avenue West; thence northwesterly and westerly along said avenue to Arbutus Street; thence southerly along said street to 37th Avenue West; thence easterly along said avenue to the Canadian Pacific Railway; thence southerly and southeasterly along said railway to the southerly production of Granville Street; thence southerly along said production to the southerly limit of said city; thence generally easterly along said limit to the point of commencement. While much of the riding's population resides in single family homes, massive redevelopment has occurred from Broadway all the way down the Cambie corridor to Marine Drive, with dense transit-oriented development popping up around stations of the Canada Line.

Members of Parliament

This riding has elected the following members of the House of Commons of Canada:

Election results

Notes

References

British Columbia federal electoral districts
Federal electoral districts in Greater Vancouver and the Fraser Valley
Politics of Vancouver